It was founded on 1977, thanks to the initiative of a group of people headed by its present Director, Doctor Ricardo Pérez Arciniegas 

It initiated work with 47 high school and 17 elementary school students. It obtained official approval of all the courses, with very high scores, in 1978, year in which the first group of high schoolers graduated. The general development of the school continued in harmony, with the decisive support of the parents, teachers, workers and students. A good part of the first campus was built with the active participation of all of the above.

All the ideals in which the school was created have been consolidated and are now a reality, The innovative programs which strive to develop the students in the human, social, technical, artistic and sporting fields, the methodology, the system of discipline; in short, all of its programs are the product of genuine interest to achieve the ideals outlined, based on own experiences and with the active participation of all.

Gimnasio del Norte has been granting high school diplomas since 1978 and has established relationships with educational centers in different countries, which part of the International Baccalaureate Organization (IBO) since 1992.

In the second semester of 2018, Gimnasio del Norte received Carlos Alberto Casas, as the new principal of the school, and said good-bye to Jose Contreras, (the previous principal of the school).

from:

References

External links
 http://www.gimnasiodelnorte.edu.co

Schools in Colombia
Educational institutions established in 1977
1977 establishments in Colombia